Men's football took place at the 1987 South Asian Games in Calcutta, India. India won its second title by defeating Nepal in the final and became the first team to defend the title successfully.

Participating nations

Fixtures and results

Group A

Group B

Bronze medal match

Gold medal match

Winners

References

1987 South Asian Games
1987 South Asian Games